The Caparaó hocicudo (Oxymycterus caparaoe) is a rodent species from South America. It is endemic to Brazil where it is found in the Pico da Bandeira mountain range.

Description
The snout is elongated making the head long and narrow. The fur is rather long and lax. The dorsal hairs have grey bases, orange midsections and blackish tips, giving an overall dark brown colour. The flanks have a wider orange band giving them a paler appearance. The underparts are orange, the individual hairs having grey bases. The upper surfaces of the hind feet are greyish brown.

Distribution and habitat
This mountain range is completely isolated from other mountain areas and is surrounded by lower lying land. These mountains are topped by cool, moist grassland and this hocicudo is plentiful in areas of bunchgrass (Cortaderia spp) and Andean bamboo (Chusquea).

Notes

References

Oxymycterus
Mammals described in 1998
Taxobox binomials not recognized by IUCN